Fungal isolates have been researched for decades. Because fungi often exist in thin mycelial monolayers, with no protective shell, immune system, and limited mobility, they have developed the ability to synthesize a variety of unusual compounds for survival. Researchers have discovered fungal isolates with anticancer, antimicrobial, immunomodulatory, and other bio-active properties. The first statins, β-Lactam antibiotics, as well as a few important antifungals, were discovered in fungi.

Chemotherapeutic isolates
BMS manufactures paclitaxel using Penicillium and plant cell fermentation. Fungi can synthesize podophyllotoxin and camptothecin, precursors to etoposide, teniposide, topotecan, and irinotecan.

Lentinan, PSK, and PSP, are registered anticancer immunologic adjuvants. Irofulven and acylfulvene are anticancer derivatives of illudin S. Clavaric acid is a reversible farnesyltransferase inhibitor. Inonotus obliquus creates betulinic acid precursor betulin. Flammulina velutipes creates asparaginase. Plinabulin is a fungal isolate derivative currently being researched for anticancer applications.

Cholesterol inhibitors
The statins lovastatin, mevastatin, and simvastatin precursor monacolin J, are fungal isolates. Additional fungal isolates that inhibit cholesterol are zaragozic acids, eritadenine, and nicotinamide riboside.

Immunosuppressants
Ciclosporin, mycophenolic acid, mizoribine, FR901483, and gliotoxin, are immunosuppressant fungal isolates.

Antimicrobials
Penicillin, cephalosporins, fusafungine, usnic acid, fusidic acid, fumagillin, brefeldin A, verrucarin A, alamethicin, are antibiotic fungal isolates. Antibiotics retapamulin, tiamulin, and valnemulin are derivatives of the fungal isolate pleuromutilin. Griseofulvin, echinocandins, strobilurin, azoxystrobin, caspofungin, micafungin, are fungal isolates with antifungal activity.

Psychotropic isolates 
The headache medications cafergot, dihydroergotamine, methysergide, methylergometrine, the dementia medications hydergine, nicergoline, the Parkinson's disease medications lisuride, bromocriptine, cabergoline, and pergolide were all derived from Claviceps isolates. Polyozellus multiplex synthesizes prolyl endopeptidase inhibitors polyozellin, thelephoric acid, and kynapcins. Boletus badius synthesizes L-theanine.

Other isolates 

Researchers have discovered other interesting fungal isolates like the antihyperglycemic compounds ternatin, aspergillusol A, sclerotiorin, and antimalarial compounds codinaeopsin, efrapeptins, and antiamoebin. The fungal isolate ergothioneine is actively absorbed and concentrated by the human body via SLC22A4. Other notable fungal isolates include vitamin D1, vitamin D2, and vitamin D4.

See also

References

External links
 Bioprospecting for Microbial Endophytes and Their Natural Products – 2003

Pharmaceutical isolates
Fungi and humans